George Gaylord Simpson (June 16, 1902 – October 6, 1984) was an American paleontologist. Simpson was perhaps the most influential paleontologist of the twentieth century, and a major participant in the modern synthesis, contributing Tempo and Mode in Evolution (1944), The Meaning of Evolution (1949) and The Major Features of Evolution (1953). He was an expert on extinct mammals and their intercontinental migrations. Simpson was extraordinarily knowledgeable about Mesozoic fossil mammals and fossil mammals of North and South America. He anticipated such concepts as punctuated equilibrium (in Tempo and Mode) and dispelled the myth that the evolution of the horse was a linear process culminating in the modern Equus caballus. He coined the word hypodigm in 1940, and published extensively on the taxonomy of fossil and extant mammals.  Simpson was influentially, and incorrectly, opposed to Alfred Wegener's theory of continental drift, but accepted the theory of plate tectonics (and continental drift) when the evidence became conclusive.

He was Professor of Zoology at Columbia University, and Curator of the Department of Geology and Paleontology at the American Museum of Natural History from 1945 to 1959. He was Curator of the Museum of Comparative Zoology at Harvard University from 1959 to 1970, and a Professor of Geosciences at the University of Arizona from 1968 until his retirement in 1982.

Awards
In 1943 Simpson was awarded the Mary Clark Thompson Medal from the National Academy of Sciences. For his work, Tempo and mode in evolution, he was awarded the academy's Daniel Giraud Elliot Medal in 1944. He was awarded the Linnean Society of London's prestigious Darwin-Wallace Medal in 1958. Simpson also received the Royal Society's Darwin Medal 'In recognition of his distinguished contributions to general evolutionary theory, based on a profound study of palaeontology, particularly of vertebrates,' in 1962. In 1966, Simpson received the Golden Plate Award of the American Academy of Achievement.

At the University of Arizona, Tucson, the Gould-Simpson Building was named in honor of Simpson and Minnesota geologist and polar explorer Lawrence M. Gould, who, like Simpson, also accepted an appointment as Professor of Geosciences at the University of Arizona after his formal retirement. Simpson was noted for his work in the fields of paleobiogeography and animal evolution.

Views
In the 1960s, Simpson "rubbished the then-nascent science of exobiology, which concerned
itself with life on places other than Earth, as a science without a subject".

He was raised as a Christian but in his early teens became an agnostic, nontheist, and philosophical naturalist.

Books

 Attending marvels (1931)
 Quantitative Zoology (1939)
 Tempo and Mode in Evolution (1944)
 The Principles of Classification and A Classification of Mammals (1945)
 The Meaning of Evolution  (1949, 1951)
 Horses (1951)
 Evolution and Geography (1953)
 The Major Features of Evolution (1953)
 Life: An Introduction to Biology (1957)
 Quantitative Zoology (1960)
 Principles of Animal Taxonomy (1961)
 This View of Life (1964)
 The Geography of Evolution (1965)
 Penguins (1976)
 Concession to the Improbable (1978) (an autobiography)
 Fossils and the History Of Life (1983)
 Splendid Isolation (1980)
 The Dechronization of Sam Magruder (posthumously published novella, 1996)

See also
Annie Montague Alexander, who helped finance some of his early work

References

Further reading

 
 
 
 

External links

George Gaylord Simpson — full and comprehensive biography by L. F. Laporte
George Gaylord Simpson  — biographical sketch from The Stephen Jay Gould Archive
George Gaylord Simpson — a short biography from the PBS Evolution'' website
George Gaylord Simpson Papers, American Philosophical Society.
George Gaylord Simpson — Open Library

1902 births
1984 deaths
Columbia University faculty
Critics of creationism
Critics of cryptozoology
Critics of Lamarckism
Harvard University staff
University of Arizona faculty
American former Christians
American agnostics
American paleontologists
American mammalogists
National Medal of Science laureates
Penrose Medal winners
Foreign Members of the Royal Society
People associated with the American Museum of Natural History
Yale University alumni
20th-century American zoologists